Exhibitionists is a Canadian documentary series that premiered on CBC Television on October 4, 2015.

Exhibitionists is young, daring and born of a passionate and personal connection with innovating artists across genres from diverse communities across Canada. It features provocative artists working in all mediums who are disrupting the status quo whilst celebrating their cultures. From a young poet who conquered Instagram to a daring feminist graffiti artist, Exhibitionists captures their stories. Topical, innovative and riveting, Exhibitionists is the go-to destination to discover Canada's fresh and diverse talents, and to get up close and personal with established icons. Hosted by actor, writer and educator Amanda Parris, Exhibitionists is an anthology of fast-paced short docs paired with excerpts of other CBC Arts digital series and the best arts-related content from across the CBC. It is produced by CBC Arts.

Featured artists
 Trey Anthony - playwright
 Margaret Atwood - writer
 Torquil Campbell - actor
 Director X - filmmaker
 Xavier Dolan - filmmaker
 Atom Egoyan - filmmaker
 Louise Lecavalier - dancer
 Ness Lee - artist
 Owen Pallett - musician
 Lido Pimienta - musician
 Djanet Sears - playwright
 Vivek Shraya - artist
 Alisi Telengut - animator
 Jacob Tremblay - actor
 Lena Waithe - writer
 Ai Weiwei - artist

External links

CBC Television original programming
Television shows filmed in Toronto
2015 Canadian television series debuts
2010s Canadian reality television series